Tehau is a surname. Notable people with the surname include:

Alvin Tehau (born 1989), Tahitian footballer
Jonathan Tehau (born 1988), Tahitian footballer
Lorenzo Tehau (born 1989), Tahitian footballer
Teaonui Tehau (born 1992), Tahitian footballer